Araldo (12 March 2008 – 4 November 2014) was a British-born Thoroughbred racehorse.
He was trained by Michael Moroney and owned by R & C Legh Racing Pty Ltd. In 2013, Araldo won The Bart Cummings, a Victoria Racing Club race held at the Flemington Racecourse. Araldo also raced at the 154th Melbourne Cup on 4 November 2014, finishing 7th with jockey Dwayne Dunn. However, after the race, he shattered a hind pastern when frightened by a spectator, and was subsequently euthanised.  Race favourite Admire Rakti also died that day from a cardiac arrest after ventricular fibrillation, after finishing last.

Pedigree

References

External links
Profile at horseracing.com.au
Profile at racenet.com.au

2008 racehorse births
2014 racehorse deaths
Racehorses bred in the United Kingdom
Racehorses trained in Germany
Racehorses trained in Australia
Thoroughbred family 9-h